Palacanthilhiopsis vervierii is a species of very small or minute freshwater snail with an operculum, an aquatic gastropod mollusk in the family Moitessieriidae.

This species is endemic to France.

References

Palacanthilhiopsis
Endemic molluscs of Metropolitan France
Gastropods described in 1988
Taxonomy articles created by Polbot